Valentyna Zhudina (née Horpynych - ; born 12 March 1983 in Zhytomyr) is a Ukrainian athlete. She competed in the 3000 metres steeplechase at the 2012 Summer Olympics, placing 22nd with a time of 9:37.90.  At the 2008 Summer Olympics, she didn't qualify beyond the first round.

Competition record

References

External links
 

1983 births
Living people
Ukrainian female steeplechase runners
Olympic athletes of Ukraine
Athletes (track and field) at the 2012 Summer Olympics
Sportspeople from Zhytomyr
Athletes (track and field) at the 2008 Summer Olympics
Universiade medalists in athletics (track and field)
Universiade silver medalists for Ukraine
Competitors at the 2005 Summer Universiade
Competitors at the 2009 Summer Universiade
Medalists at the 2007 Summer Universiade
K. D. Ushinsky South Ukrainian National Pedagogical University alumni